Calcium caseinate is one of several milk proteins derived from casein in skim and 1% milk. Calcium caseinate is primarily used in meal preparation and fat breakdown. Caseinates are produced by adding an alkali to another derivative of casein, acid casein. The type of caseinate is determined by the cation added alongside the acid casein. Other cations used to form caseinates besides calcium include ammonium, potassium, and sodium. Calcium caseinate contains about 17% glutamic acid. Calcium caseinate is also soluble and does not clot in the stomach.

Physical Properties 
Calcium caseinate is generally stable at a pH above 5.7, and appears as a milky liquid. This is unlike ammonium, potassium, and sodium caseinates, which are practically clear. At a neutral or acidic pH, casein is relatively insoluble in water, and is easily separated from other milk proteins, sugars, and minerals. Most caseinates are capable of withstanding temperatures of 140°C (284°F), however calcium caseinate is influenced by heat with temperatures as low as 50°C (122°F). Calcium is a divalent cation, allowing it to form bonds with several caseinate anions. This leads to the formation of several covalent bonds between caseinate anions, which can ultimately cause the cross-linked caseinate to form pockets of hydrophobic regions.

Food Content and Uses of Casein 
Several foods, creamers, and toppings all contain a variety of caseinates. Sodium caseinate acts as a greater food additive for stabilizing processed foods, however companies could opt to use calcium caseinate to increase calcium content and decrease sodium levels in their products.

Notes

Mammalian proteins
Dairy products
Calcium compounds
Food additives